Konca Kuriş (16 October 1961 – 1999) was a Turkish feminist writer who was murdered by the Kurdish Hezbollah in Konya, Turkey, on 20 July 1999 after having disappeared in 1998.

Death
Kuriş was allegedly a former member of the Kurdish Hezbollah but later denounced the organisation and criticised dogmatic interpretations of the Qur'an. Kuriş disappeared in July 1998. She was tortured for 38 days and then killed and buried in a shallow grave. Torture sessions were recorded by the killers. Her body was found in January 2000 after the operation in which Hüseyin Velioğlu, the Hizbollah leader was killed. She was 38.

Perpetrators
Kurdish Hezbollah claimed responsibility for her abduction, torture, and death with a statement "An enemy of Islam and a secular-feminist Konca Kuriş due to her actions and statements against Allah and Quran Al Karim, has been kidnapped by Hizbullah warriors and questioned in our bases. Konca Kuriş, who has been acting in parallel with the official religion statements and under the directives of the irreligious-secular Turkish Republic  and also who has been used by the Zionists as well, has been punished according to the requirements of the sheria law for initiating activities that would put Muslims into doubt." It was found that Hezbollah killed many people. The only woman victim of Hezbollah is Kuriş.

Personal life
She was married to Orhan Kuriş and had five children. She was a devout Muslim.

Legacy
A plaque with the text, Konca Kuris 1960-1998 Tortured and murdered for advocating women's rights in Islam, had been placed at the "Canberra Nara Peace Park", part of the Lennox Gardens in Canberra, Australia.

References

1960 births
1998 deaths
Burials at Mersin Cemetery
People persecuted by Muslims
People killed by Islamic terrorism
Proponents of Islamic feminism
Turkish feminist writers
Turkish torture victims
20th-century Turkish women writers